1968 in Korea may refer to:
1968 in North Korea
1968 in South Korea